Varsovia (Breton, Latin, Romanian and Spanish - Warsaw (the capital city of Poland)) may refer to:

 Varsovia (train), a train named after Warsaw
 Warsaw, the city itself